Heywood may refer to:

People
Heywood (given name), including a list of people with the name
Heywood (surname), including a list of people and fictional characters with the name

Places

Antarctica
 Heywood Island (Antarctica), South Shetland Islands
 Heywood Lake, in Three Lakes Valley, South Orkney Islands

Australia
 Heywood, Victoria
 Shire of Heywood, former local government area
 Heywood Island (Western Australia)

United Kingdom
 Heywood, Greater Manchester
 Municipal Borough of Heywood, Lancashire, former local government district
 Heywood (UK Parliament constituency)
 Heywood and Middleton (UK Parliament constituency)
 Heywood, Norfolk
 Heywood, Wiltshire

Other uses
 Heywood's Bank, a private banking firm 1788–1874
 Heywood Chair Factory, Philadelphia, U.S.
 Heywood-Wakefield Company, formerly Heywood Brothers, an American furniture manufacturer
 Heywood Preparatory School, in Corsham, England
 Heywood-class attack transport, a class of U.S. Navy ships
 USS Heywood (APA-6)
 Bo Donaldson and The Heywoods, an American pop music group

See also
 Haywood (disambiguation)
 Heywoodia, a genus of plants
 Heywood Hill Literary Prize
 Heywood Manuscript,  a collection of handwritten copies of letters and poems of the Heywood family
 Levi Heywood Memorial Library Building, in Gardner, Massachusetts, U.S.
 R v Heywood, a case in the Canadian Supreme Court